Oto Melara Hitfist is a two-man turret, for armored vehicles, developed by the Italian Oto Melara. 
The turrets are designed to mount a 25mm Oerlikon KBA or 30/40mm ATK Mk44 Bushmaster II autocannon. The main armament may mount a co-axial machine gun. A variant allows the operator to aim and fire anti-tank missiles.  

The turret, and its weapons, can be operated by a single individual.

Oto Melara also sells a smaller remotely operated turret, named Hitrole, that mounts smaller weapons, like machine guns and automatic grenade launchers.

Oto Melara sells a similar appearing remotely operated turret, called Hitfist OWS.

The 30mm variant of the Hitfist turret adds  to a vehicle's weight.

References

External links 
https://electronics.leonardo.com/en/products/hitfist-ows

https://electronics.leonardo.com/en/products/hitfist
Weapon turrets